The siege of Belgrade was a siege of Belgrade, an important fortified town of the Serbian Despotate and the key fortress of the Hungarian defense line after the Ottoman subjugation of Serbia in 1439, by the forces of the Ottoman Empire, spanning over five months in 1440.

Background 
The struggle over the throne of Hungary and Slavonia resulted in a civil war that provided the Ottomans with an opportunity for advancement. Seizing upon this opportunity, Sultan Murad II decided to capture Belgrade.

Forces
The Belgrade castle was protected by the canons which were placed there during the period of Serbian Despot Stefan Lazarević. The Ottoman Army, commanded by Murad II and Ali Beg Evrenosoglu, built a wall around the city and used it to hurl stones at its fortifications. They also used cannons cast in Smederevo, the Despotate capital they had captured a year before.

The strength of the Belgrade garrison is unknown. Besides Talovac's banderij of around 500 men from Croatia, the garrison was enforced with Czech and Italian mercenary archers. The local Serb population also assisted defenders Talovac's forces had significant advantage because some of them used rifles, which was the first usage of the rifles against the Ottomans.

Battle 
Murad II approached Belgrade with his forces at the end of April 1440. Taloci was not immediately aware of the size of the Ottoman forces. He had initially intended to defeat them on the open battlefield, but when he realized his forces were heavily outnumbered, Taloci retreated to the city.  Murad II ordered building of mobile towers and cannons of different sizes, fortified his position and besieged the city.

According to Konstantin Mihailović, the title of bey and a corresponding estate was promised to the Ottoman soldier who waved the Ottoman flag on the Belgrade walls. Although Evrenosoğlu already had the title of bey at that time, he decided to personally lead the assault on the walls of the Belgrade castle, in hopes of increasing his already great reputation.

References

Sources

Conflicts in 1440
Serbian Despotate
Belgrade
Belgrade 1440
Belgrade 1440
Belgrade 1440
1440 in the Ottoman Empire
15th century in Belgrade
Military history of Belgrade